Robinson Park is an urban park located in and administered by the city of Wisconsin Rapids, Wisconsin. The park was named after Dr. F. Byron Robinson, the original owner of the site.

Amenities include a picnic shelter and volleyball, horseshoe and basketball courts.

References

Wisconsin Rapids, Wisconsin
Geography of Wood County, Wisconsin
Parks in Wisconsin